Rhagovelia gastrotricha is a species of aquatic bug first found in Altaquer, Río Ñambí, Nariño, Colombia.

References

Further reading
 Gil, DN Padilla. "HEMIPTERA: Description of the eggs and immature stages of Rhagovelia gastrotricha Padilla-Gil, 2011 and Paravelia daza Padilla-Gil y Moreira, 2011 (Hemiptera: Heteroptera: Veliidae)(In Spanish)." Dugesiana20.2 (2015).
 Gil, Dora Nancy Padilla. "LAS CHINCHES SEMI-ACUÁTICAS DE LA RESERVA NATURAL RÍO ÑAMBÍ (NARIÑO), COLOMBIA The Semi-Aquatic Bugs from the Ñambi River Natural Reserve (Nariño), Colombia." (2015).

Veliidae
Endemic fauna of Colombia
Insects described in 2011